Gargar River, is a man-made canal which is a world heritage site and a part of Shushtar Historical Hydraulic System, located in the island city Shushtar, Khouzestan, Iran from the Sassanid era. Gargar River was registered on UNESCO's list of World Heritage Sites in 2009 and is Iran's 10th cultural heritage site to be registered on the United Nations' list together with the 12 other historical bridges, dams, canals, watermills and buildings as Shushtar Historical Hydraulic System.

References

World Heritage Sites in Iran
Protected areas of Iran